Baladiyah al-Ulaya, in English as the Ulaya Sub-Municipality, is an urban baladiyah and one of 16 sub-municipalities of Riyadh, Saudi Arabia. Founded in 1978 (1398 Hijri), it consists of 15 other commercial and residential districts, including King Abdulaziz District, King Fahd District, King Abdullah District and most of al-Olaya and as-Sulimaniyah besides being responsible for their development, planning and maintenance.

Neighborhoods and districts 

 al-Olaya
 as-Sulimaniyah
 King Abdulaziz District (North)
 King Abdullah District (South)
 al-Wahah
 Salahuddin
 al-Wurud
 al-Mursalat
 an-Nuzhah
 al-Mughrizat
 al-Izdihar
 at-Taawun
 as-Masiaf

References 

Ulaya
Subdivisions of Saudi Arabia